North Central may refer to:

 North Central Airlines, a defunct United States based airline
 North Central College, a private, 4-year  liberal arts college located in Naperville, Illinois
 The North Central region of the United States, which is divided into the West North Central States and the East North Central States
 North Central Nigeria
North Central Province, Maldives
North Central Province, Sri Lanka
 North Central Region, United States, the former name of the Midwestern United States
 North Central Region (WFTDA)
 North Central University in Minneapolis, Minnesota
Northcentral University, a doctoral research university
 North Central Conference (disambiguation)

See also

 North (disambiguation)
 Central (disambiguation)
 Centre (disambiguation)
 Center (disambiguation)